Thomas Hawley  was a clergyman in the Church of Ireland during the 18th century.

Hawley was educated at Trinity College, Dublin.  He was Archdeacon of Dublin from 1710 until 1715.

References

Archdeacons of Dublin
Alumni of Trinity College Dublin
18th-century Irish Anglican priests